Gabrielle Williams (born 27 October 1982) is an Australian politician. She has been a Labor Party member of the Victorian Legislative Assembly since November 2014, representing the seat of Dandenong.

Williams holds a Bachelor of Arts and a Bachelor of Laws from Monash University.

In December 2014, Williams was appointed as Parliamentary Secretary for Carers and Volunteers. In July 2016, she was appointed Parliamentary Secretary for Industry, Employment and Volunteers. In November 2016, following a further reshuffle, Williams was appointed Parliamentary Secretary for Health and Parliamentary Secretary for Carers and Volunteers.

Upon the return of the Andrews Labor Government at the 2018 Victorian election, Williams was elevated to the Ministry, serving as Minister for the Prevention of Family Violence, Minister for Women and, as the youngest member of Cabinet, the Minister for Youth.

Following the retirement of Gavin Jennings in March 2020, Williams was additionally appointed as Minister for Aboriginal Affairs but relinquished her role as Minister for Youth. In June 2022, Williams was appointed as Minister for Mental Health and Minister for Treaty And First Peoples.

References

External links
 Parliamentary voting record of Gabrielle Williams at Victorian Parliament Tracker
 

|-

1982 births
Living people
Australian Labor Party members of the Parliament of Victoria
Members of the Victorian Legislative Assembly
Victorian Ministers for Women
Monash University alumni
21st-century Australian lawyers
Australian women lawyers
21st-century Australian politicians
21st-century Australian women politicians
Women members of the Victorian Legislative Assembly